Somsara-ye Sofla (also Romanized as Somsarā-ye Soflá; also known as Somsarā Pā’īn and Somsarā-ye Pā’īn) is a village in Bala Jam Rural District, Nasrabad District, Torbat-e Jam County, Razavi Khorasan Province, Iran. At the 2006 census, its population was 206, in 42 families.

References 

Populated places in Torbat-e Jam County